Sulphur Bank may refer to:
Sulphur Bank, California, former name of Eastlake, Lake County, California
Sulphur Bank Mine